Miletus drucei  is a butterfly in the family Lycaenidae. It is found in the Philippines and on Borneo (M. d. metrovius).

Subspecies
 M. d. drucei
 M. d. metrovius (Fruhstorfer, 1913) (Borneo)

References

Miletus (butterfly)
Butterflies described in 1889
Butterflies of Asia
Taxa named by Georg Semper